The Taylor's Candy Factory, also known as Sticky Taylor's Candy Factory, located on Main Street in Paris, Idaho, was listed on the National Register of Historic Places in 1983.

It is a small wood frame false front commercial structure built sometime before 1929.  It is now located on Main Street near West First Street North, facing east, but was moved to this location from a site on the same block sometime in the 1940s.

References

External links

Commercial buildings on the National Register of Historic Places in Idaho
Bear Lake County, Idaho
Confectionery stores